Franklin Stanwood (March 16, 1852 – June 20, 1888) was an American artist from Maine.

Stanwood was born at the Portland Alms House in 1852 and immediately adopt by Capt. Gideon Stanwood of Gorham. He was educated in the Portland Public Schools. He eventually became a sailor and later a painter. He was known for painting nautical themes as well as house portraits.

Stanwood died of tuberculosis at the age of 36 and is interred at Western Cemetery in Portland.

Other reading
 Chance, James. "Charles Dickens and Franklin Stanwood." The Dickensian, vol. 110, no. 494, 2014, pp. 201.

References

1852 births
1888 deaths
Artists from Portland, Maine
People from Gorham, Maine
Painters from Maine
19th-century deaths from tuberculosis
Burials at Western Cemetery (Portland, Maine)
Tuberculosis deaths in Maine